The 1966 NAIA men's basketball tournament was held in March at Municipal Auditorium in Kansas City, Missouri. The 29th annual NAIA basketball tournament featured 32 teams playing in a single-elimination format. This tournament featured the game with the most points scored. Al Tucker received the MVP award for the second time this year.

Awards and honors
Leading scorer: Al Tucker, Oklahoma Baptist; 5 games, 69 field goals, 44 free throws, 182 total points (36.4 average points per game)
Leading rebounder: Richard Pitts, Norfolk State (Va.); 5 games, 76 total rebounds (15.2 average rebounds per game)
Player of the Year: est. 1994
Most team points; single-game: 132, Norfolk State (Va.) vs. Upper Iowa 97
Most team points; tournament: 521, Norfolk State (Va.), (104.2 avg.)
Most field goals made; single-game: 57, Norfolk State (Va.) vs. Upper Iowa
Most field goals made; tournament: 216, Norfolk State (Va.)
Top single-game performances: Earl Beechum 11th, Midwestern State (Texas) vs. Monmouth (N.J.); 20 field goals, 6 free throws 46 total points
All-time leading scorer; second appearance: Al Tucker 2nd, Oklahoma Baptist (1965,66,67); 15 games, 177 field goals, 117 free throws, 471 total points (31.4 points per game).

1966 NAIA bracket

  * denotes overtime.

Third-place game
The third-place game featured the losing teams from the national semifinalist to determine 3rd and 4th places in the tournament. This game was played until 1988.

See also
 1966 NCAA University Division basketball tournament
 1966 NCAA College Division basketball tournament

References

NAIA Men's Basketball Championship
Tournament
NAIA men's basketball tournament
NAIA men's basketball tournament
College basketball tournaments in Missouri
Basketball competitions in Kansas City, Missouri